The following article is a summary of the 2017 Indonesia national football team results.

Men's Senior Football Team

Managers of 2017
Included just matches against country.

Goalscorers

Record

Fixtures and Result

International Friendly 

Source:

 1 Not an international FIFA match "A".

2017 Aceh World Solidarity Tsunami Cup

Men's under-U-23 Football Team

Managers of 2017
Includes just against country

Goal scorers

Record

Fixtures and results

Friendly Matches

International Friendly

2018 AFC U-23 Championship qualification

2017 Southeast Asian Games

Group B

Semi finals

Bronze medal match

Men's under-19 Football Team

Managers of 2017
Includes just against country

Goal scorers

Record

Fixtures and results

Friendly Matches

International Friendly 

Source:

2017 Toulon Tournament

Group C

2017 AFF U-18 Youth Championship

Group B

Semi-finals

Third place match

2018 AFC U-19 Championship qualification

Men's under-16 Football Team

Managers of 2017
Includes just against country

Goal scorers

Record

Fixtures and results

Friendly Matches

International Friendly

2017 Tien Phong Plastic Cup Tournament

2017 AFF U-15 Youth Championship

Group A

2018 AFC U-16 Championship qualification

Women's under-15 Football Team

Managers of 2017
Includes just against country

Goal scorers

Record

Fixtures and results

Friendly Matches

International Friendly

2017 AFF U-15 Women's Championship

Group B

References

Indonesia
2017